Holstianthus is a monotypic genus of flowering plants belonging to the family Rubiaceae. It only contains one species, Holstianthus barbigularis Steyerm. 

It is native to Venezuela.

The genus name of Holstianthus is in honour of Bruce K. Holst (b. 1957), an American botanist who worked at the Missouri Botanical Garden and the Marie Selby Botanical Gardens in Florida. The Latin specific epithet of barbigularis refers to barba'' meaning bearded and gularis 
from 'gula' meaning "throat".

Both the genus and species were first described and published Ann. Missouri Bot. Gard. Vol.73 on page 495 in 1986.

References

Rubiaceae
Rubiaceae genera
Plants described in 1986
Flora of Venezuela